Hans-Hermann Magnussen (9 September 1925 – 17 July 2000) was a German sailor. He competed in the 5.5 Metre event at the 1952 Summer Olympics.

References

External links
 

1925 births
2000 deaths
German male sailors (sport)
Olympic sailors of Germany
Sailors at the 1952 Summer Olympics – 5.5 Metre
Sportspeople from Kiel